Ericydeus is a genus of broad-nosed weevils in the beetle family Curculionidae. There are about 16 described species in Ericydeus.

Species
These 16 species belong to the genus Ericydeus:

 Ericydeus argentinensis Lanteri, 1995 c g
 Ericydeus bahiensis Lanteri, 1995 c g
 Ericydeus cupreolus Lanteri, 1995 c g
 Ericydeus duodecimpunctatus Champion, 1911 c g
 Ericydeus forreri Champion, 1911 c g
 Ericydeus hancocki (Kirby, 435) c g
 Ericydeus lautus (LeConte, 1856) i c g b
 Ericydeus modestus Gyllenhal, 625 c g
 Ericydeus nigropunctatus (Chevrolat, 1877) c g
 Ericydeus placidus (Horn, 1876) i c g
 Ericydeus quadripunctatus Champion, 1911 c g
 Ericydeus roseiventris Champion, 1911 c g
 Ericydeus schoenherri Perty, 1832 c g
 Ericydeus sedecimpunctatus (Linnaeus, 1758) c g
 Ericydeus viridans Boheman, 1840 c g
 Ericydeus yucatanus Champion, 1911 c g

Data sources: i = ITIS, c = Catalogue of Life, g = GBIF, b = Bugguide.net

References

Further reading

External links

Entiminae
Articles created by Qbugbot